Koninklijke Racing Waregem is a Belgian football club based in Waregem as is rival club Zulte-Waregem. It is currently playing in the eerste provinciale. The home ground of the club is Mirakelstadion.

History
It was founded in 1941 as Racing Kleithoek but it changed its name to Racing Waregem two years later when it registered to the Belgian Football Association. The club changed its name again in 1992. In 2006 it finished 5th of the Belgian Third Division A and won the promotion playoff to play in the second division. This would only last for one year, as they just failed to complete an amazing come-back during the second half of the season. Waregem finally ended 17th and relegated back to Third Division A.

References

External links
  

Racing Waregem
Association football clubs established in 1941
1941 establishments in Belgium
Organisations based in Belgium with royal patronage